Georges Suarez (1890–1944) was a French writer, essayist and journalist. Initially a pacifist, then a collaborator (he had been editor of Aujourd'hui, a French newspaper controlled by the Third Reich after the resignation of the writer Henri Jeanson), he was also the biographer of Pétain and other figures of the French Third Republic. He was the first journalist sentenced to death during the Épuration légale.

Biography 

Suarez was trained as a jurist. He fought in World War I, and afterwards became a  correspondent for the agence Havas news agency in Vienna. During this period, he worked with several newspapers including Le Temps and L'Écho de Paris.

In the interwar 
In the 1920s, Suarez started writing several works in collaboration with Joseph Kessel, who remained loyal to Suarez until his death. Suarez, who was then a member of Action Française, joined with Kessel in producing an interview with Charles Maurras.

Up until the 1930s, Suarez displayed a lively interest in the politics of the French Third  Republic; he was particularly interested in Georges Clemenceau and Aristide Briand, to whom he devoted long monographs of anecdotes.

Like many of his contemporaries, Suarez adopted an ambiguous political stance over the course  of time.  Switching back and forth between the left (he was interested in the Cartel des gauches left-wing alliance) and the right (he followed the Stavisky Affair and the riot at the Palais Bourbon in 1934), Suarez preserved a centrist, pacifist and germanophile stance.

Suarez often met with journalists close to Jean Luchaire's daily newspaper Notre temps, which supported Briand's politics of peace with Germany.  He was also close to Bertrand de Jouvenel and the Cercle du grand pavois, and to Fernand de Brinon of the Association France-Allemagne. His written work became gradually more hostile to the Third Republic, which he blamed for France's socio-economic ills of the 1930s.

In 1935, along with Drieu La Rochelle, Paul Marion and Pierre Pucheu, he strongly criticised the republican government, publicly lamenting their inability to solve the economic crisis, and calling for a new technocracy (they used the term "synarchy") which would be capable, according to them, of dispensing with the problems posed by capitalism. Like many of his associates, Suarez became close to the Parti populaire français (PPF) of Jacques Doriot, and, after the French defeat of 1940, collaborationist circles.

He published articles in favour of "synarchism" and "technocratism" such as had been theorised by Georges Lefranc, Georges Albertini and Bertrand de Jouvenel, and under the occupation he condemned the "corruption" and the "conspiracies" of the Third Republic, writing in newspapers like Libération and Aujourd'hui. Suarez' radical positions led him to support the Riom trials of the Vichy regime, trials set up in order to bring to justice those political figures of the Third Republic allegedly responsible for France's defeat of 1940.

Vichy France 
From 1940, Suarez became one of the first biographers of Marshal Philippe Pétain; In 1941 Suarez devoted a further work to him with the provocative title Pétain ou la démocratie? Il faut choisir (Pétain or democracy? You have to choose).

In 1944, despite his collaborationist involvement, Suarez wrote in vain to Compiègne camp's superintendent, Doctor Illers, to ask for the freedom of his friend Robert Desnos, a supporter of the résistance.

Death sentence 
Suarez was sentenced to death in 1944; he was shot on 9 November. It was Charles de Gaulle who vowed to execute journalists and writers who had collaborated with the Vichy government. Suarez was the first among those to be executed.

Family 
After his death, his wife Gaët tried to get the proper visas to come to the United States, but she never succeeded.

Works 

 (with Joseph Kessel), Le Onze mai, Paris, Éditions NRF, 1924.
 (with Joseph Kessel), Au camp des vaincus, ou la Critique du 11 mai, Paris, Éd. NRF, 1924.
 (with Joseph Kessel), Chez M. Paul Faure et M. Charles Maurras, [?], 1926.
 De Poincaré à Poincaré, Paris, [?], 1928.
 Peu d'hommes, trop d'idées ! Et Un entretien avec Charles Maurras par J. Kessel, Paris, De France, 1928 [rééd. Déterna, 2000].
 Une nuit chez Cromwell. Précédé d'un important récit historique de Raymond Poincaré, Paris, Éditions de France, 1930
 La Belgique Vivante, pref. André Tardieu, [?], Éditions Rex, [1932].
 La vie orgueilleuse de Clémenceau. t. 1 Clémenceau. Dans la mêlée, Paris, J. Tallandier, 1932.
 La vie orgueilleuse de Clémenceau. t. 2 Clémenceau. Dans l'action, Paris, J. Tallandier, 1932.
 Les Hommes malades de la paix, Paris, Grasset, 1933.
 Profils de rechange, Paris, Excelsior, 1933.
 La Grande peur du 6 février au Palais-Bourbon, Paris, Grasset, 1934.
 Les Heures héroïques du Cartel, Paris, Grasset, 1934.
 Soixante années d'histoire française. Clemenceau, Paris, Éditions de France, 1934.
 Pour un parti central, Paris, Denoël et Steele, 1936.
 Nos seigneurs et maîtres, Paris, Éditions de  France, 1937.
 Briand  : sa vie, son œuvre, avec son journal et de nombreux documents inédits, 6. vol. Paris, Plon, 1938-1952.
 Les Accords franco-britanniques économiques et financiers. L’Empire français et la guerre, Paris, Odef, 1940.
 « Préface » à Pierre Dehillotte, Gestapo : l'organisation, les chefs, les agents, l'action de la Gestapo à l'étranger,  Paris, Payot, 1940.
 Le maréchal Pétain, Paris, Plon, 1940 [rééd. Déterna, 1999].
 Pétain ou la démocratie ? Il faut choisir, Paris, Grasset, 1941.
 (et Guy Laborde), Agonie de la paix (1935-1939), Paris, Plon, 1942.
 Espagne, pont de l'Europe, Paris, Éditions France-Empire, 1944.

1890 births
1944 deaths
French male non-fiction writers
20th-century French journalists
Executed French collaborators with Nazi Germany
20th-century French male writers
French military personnel of World War I